Gentle Giant is the first album by British progressive rock band Gentle Giant, released in 1970.

Releases
Since the LP was not originally released in the United States, the cover illustration was instead used for the Three Friends album.

Legacy
American hip-hop duo Madvillain sampled "Funny Ways" on "Strange Ways" from their album Madvillainy, which was subsequently featured in an episode of the television show The Boondocks.

Track listing

Personnel

Musicians
Gary Green – lead guitar, 12 string guitar (2, 4 & 5), backing vocals
Kerry Minnear – Hammond organ (1-3 & 5-7), Minimoog (3, 5 & 7), Mellotron (1 & 6), electric (5), acoustic (2 & 5) and honky-tonk (4) piano, tympani (tracks 1 & 3), xylophone (4), vibraphone (3), cellos (2), bass (2), backing and lead (3 & 6) vocals
Derek Shulman – lead (1-3, 5 & 6) and backing vocals, bass (4)
Phil Shulman – trumpet (1-3 & 7), alto (3) and tenor (5 & 6) saxophones, descant (6), treble (6) and tenor (6) recorder, backing and lead (2-5) vocals
Ray Shulman – bass (1-3 & 5-7), electric (5-7) and acoustic (5) guitar, violin (1), violins (2 & 4), triangle (2), backing vocals
Martin Smith – drums (tracks 1-3 & 5-7), brushed snare drum (track 4)

Additional musicians
 Paul Cosh – tenor horn (1)
 Claire Deniz – cello (4)

Production
 Roy Baker – recording engineer
 George Underwood – cover artist
 Tony Visconti – producer

References

The Rough Guide to Rock (2nd ed.). Rough Guides Ltd. 1999. p. 424.

External links
 

1970 debut albums
Gentle Giant albums
Albums produced by Tony Visconti
Repertoire Records albums
Vertigo Records albums
Albums recorded at Trident Studios